Philodendron hastatum is a species of plant in the genus Philodendron. The species has previously been known by synonyms such as Philodendron domesticum or other names, a confusion made worse by the large degree of morphological variation in this and similar Philodendron. Commonly known as the silver sword philodendron, the plant is known for its silvery coloration especially in juvenile leaves.

References 

hastatum
Plants described in 1855